Anne Cummins may refer to:

 Anna Mickelson (born 1980), married name Cummins, American rower
 Anne Cummins (social worker) (1869–1936), British medical social worker